Beautiful is the fourteenth and final studio album by American musician Teena Marie. It was posthumously released in January 2013 under Universal Music.

The album was completed by Marie's daughter, Alia Rose, due to her death in December 2010.

Track listing

References

2013 albums
Universal Music Group albums
Teena Marie albums
Albums published posthumously